In mathematics, the Hessian group is a finite group of order 216, introduced by  who named it for Otto Hesse. It may be represented as the group of affine transformations with determinant 1 of the affine plane over the field of 3 elements. It has a normal subgroup that is an elementary abelian group of order 32, and the quotient by this subgroup is isomorphic to the group SL2(3) of order 24. It also acts on the Hesse pencil of elliptic curves, and forms the automorphism group of the Hesse configuration of the 9 inflection points of these curves and the  12 lines through triples of these points.

References

External links

Finite groups